Stefan James Wilson (born 20 September 1989 in Sheffield, UK) is a British racing driver. He is the younger brother of the late Formula One and IndyCar Series driver Justin Wilson.  He is also the winner of the 2007 McLaren Autosport BRDC Award for promising young British drivers.

Career

Formula Palmer Audi and British F3
After a long karting career as a child, Stefan stepped up to open-wheel racing in November 2006, competing in the Formula Palmer Audi Autumn Trophy at Snetterton and Brands Hatch. Stefan gradually improved throughout his first six car races and finished the six-race mini-series in ninth place, also ending as top rookie. He picked up three top-six finishes and set the fastest lap in the final round at Brands Hatch.

Stefan competed in the 2007 Formula Palmer Audi Championship, the 10th anniversary of the series, and also the 10th anniversary of when his brother Justin won the first FPA title. He finished 2nd in the championship after a great final round at Croft, where he scored 2 podiums after his worst qualifying of the season, only starting 7th and 9th for the two races. Stefan overtook a total of 11 cars. He also closed the final gap between him and more experienced driver Tim Bridgman to just 28 points.

He scored 4 wins throughout the season; the first came in round 4 of the championship at the Brands Hatch Grand Prix circuit in front of nearly 50,000 spectators. The second half of Wilson's championship was more successful as he scored 4 pole positions and 3 of his 4 wins. Wilson ended the championship in 2nd place, with a tally of 4 wins, 9 podiums, 4 pole positions, 5 fastest laps, and 2 lap records.

At the end of the season he won the McLaren Autosport BRDC Award for young British drivers. Part of the award was a prize drive in a McLaren Formula One car, which took place on the Silverstone National Circuit on 13 November 2009.

In 2008 he competed in the British Formula 3 Championship National Class in 2008 with Fluid Motorsport and captured 4 class wins on his way to 4th in the National Class points standings.

Indy Lights
Wilson signed to race a partial schedule in Firestone Indy Lights in 2009 for First Motorsports with cars prepared by Walker Racing that included six road and street courses. He qualified third at Long Beach but was sidelined by a mechanical problem towards the finish. His best finish was fourth in the wet/dry race at Toronto. In 2010 returned to the series to race for Bryan Herta Autosport. Wilson finished 11th in points despite missing one race due to funding issues and another due to a damaged racecar. He had a career-best finish of third in the season opener at St. Pete and ran the fastest race lap in Toronto.

In 2011 he returned to Indy Lights full-time with Andretti Autosport. He captured one pole, two wins, and finished on the podium three more times to finish third in the championship. Despite Wilson's 2011 success, he was out of racing until the 2012 Indy Lights season finale at Auto Club Speedway where he drove for Fan Force United and finished sixth.

IndyCar
Wilson made his IndyCar debut at the 2013 Grand Prix of Baltimore driving for Dale Coyne Racing, finishing sixteenth. His brother Justin drove the other full-time entry for Dale Coyne Racing, making the Wilson brothers the first pair of brothers to drive in IndyCar for the same team since Gary Bettenhausen and Tony Bettenhausen Jr. drove for their family team in 1983.

In June 2014 Fan Force United announced that they had signed Wilson for the team's full-time step up to the IndyCar Series in 2015. However, this entry ultimately did not materialize.

On 26 April 2016, it was announced that Wilson would be driving for KV Racing Technology at the 100th Running of the Indianapolis 500. Wilson would be driving the No. 25 Driven2SaveLives Chevy. He chose No. 25 in honor of his late brother Justin, who drove the No. 25 car when he received his fatal injuries during an incident at the 2015 ABC Supply 500.

A fuel gamble put Wilson in the lead late in the 2018 Indianapolis 500, but he had to pit for fuel with four laps to go, and Will Power won the race.

Wilson finished in last place at the 2021 Indianapolis 500 due to a crash upon entering the pit lane early in the race.

Racing record

Career summary

American open-wheel racing results 
(key)

Indy Lights

IndyCar Series
(key)

* Season still in progress.

Indianapolis 500

Complete IMSA SportsCar Championship results
(key) (Races in bold indicate pole position; results in italics indicate fastest lap)

References

External links
Stefan Wilson Official Website
 

English racing drivers
Living people
1989 births
IndyCar Series drivers
Indy Lights drivers
Formula Palmer Audi drivers
Indianapolis 500 drivers
Walker Racing drivers
Bryan Herta Autosport drivers
Andretti Autosport drivers
Dale Coyne Racing drivers
KV Racing Technology drivers
WeatherTech SportsCar Championship drivers
DragonSpeed drivers
Fluid Motorsport Development drivers
Dreyer & Reinbold Racing drivers